Colin Philp may refer to:

 Colin Philp Sr. (born 1947), Fijian sailor
 Colin Philp Jr. (1964–2021), Fijian sailor